Příbram is a city in the Central Bohemian Region of the Czech Republic.

Pribram or Příbram may also refer to:

Astronomy
Příbram meteorite, which fell on 7 April 1959 east of Příbram, Czech Republic
9884 Příbram, a minor planet named for the meteorite

Places
Příbram District, a district in the Central Bohemian Region of the Czech Republic
Uhelná Příbram, a market town (městys) in Havlíčkův Brod District, Vysočina Region, Czech Republic
Příbram na Moravě village and municipality (obec) in Brno-Country District in the South Moravian Region of the Czech Republic

Sports
1. FK Příbram, a Czech football club from Příbram
CK Příbram Fany Gastro, a UCI Continental cycling team based in the Czech Republic

People with the surname
Alfred Pribram (1841–1912), Bohemian internist born in Prague
Alfred Francis Pribram (1859–1942), British historian of Austrian origin
 (1879-1940), Austrian-born pathologist and biochemist
Karl Pribram (disambiguation), several people
Karl Přibram (1877–1973), Austrian-born economist
Karl H. Pribram (1919–2015), Austrian-born neurosurgeon and theorist of cognition
Richard Pribram (1847–1928), Austrian chemist

See also